Weera Koedpudsa (born 1 July 1984), simply known as Ra is a Thai former professional footballer who plays as a goalkeeper.

International career

Weera has been a member of the Full Thailand National team on a number of occasions but has so far failed to be used in any means other than an unused substitute

International

Honours

Club
Bangkok United
 Thai Premier League (1): 2006

International
Thailand U-23
 Sea Games  Gold Medal (1); 2007

Match fixing scandal and ban
On February 21, 2017 Weera was accused of match-fixing on several league games. He was arrested by royal thai police and banned from football for life.

References

External links
 

1984 births
Living people
Weera Koedpudsa
Weera Koedpudsa
Association football goalkeepers
Weera Koedpudsa
Weera Koedpudsa
Weera Koedpudsa
Weera Koedpudsa
Weera Koedpudsa
Weera Koedpudsa
Weera Koedpudsa
Weera Koedpudsa
Weera Koedpudsa
Weera Koedpudsa
2007 AFC Asian Cup players
Southeast Asian Games medalists in football
Weera Koedpudsa
Competitors at the 2007 Southeast Asian Games